Count Gore de Vol is a television horror host who originally appeared on Washington, D.C.'s WDCA from 1973 to 1987. Originally named M.T. Graves and played by announcer Dick Dyszel, the character first appeared on the WDCA version of the Bozo the Clown program. When the character got a positive reaction, he was given his own program, called Creature Feature. The choice of Gore de Vol as the character's name was either a pun involving the name of acerbic author Gore Vidal or the name of a prominent Washington, D.C. funeral home, "de Vol". Gore de Vol became the Washington/Baltimore area's longest-running horror host, broadcast every Saturday night on WDCA from March 1973 to May 1987. He returned to the D.C. airwaves for a one-time special, Countdown with the Count, on New Year's Eve 1999.

Background
Count Gore de Vol's contribution to the American horror host tradition is significant in a number of ways.  As Washington D.C.'s horror host throughout most of the 1970s and 1980s, Gore used the platform to satirize national politics from a local perspective.  In the era of the Watergate scandal and Iran–Contra affair, Count Gore took frequent shots at the political folly with an ad lib, shoot-from-the-hip style that led local audiences to feel they were part of an Inside the Beltway private joke even when the subject was high profile.

Count Gore's Creature Feature also embraced the sexual revolution of the 1970s, and his guests for the show included several Penthouse Pets. Though he never had an official sidekick, he frequently employed the talents of writer and actress Eleanor Herman in the role of Countess von Stauffenberger.  The two played off each other with a series of romantic near misses and sexual innuendos that made the show a success even when many horror hosts were losing their shows in the wake of the original Saturday Night Live.

Gore's iconoclastic style surfaced in a number of other ways.  He was the first host in America to broadcast an unedited version of Night of the Living Dead. He also began transmitting his own show in stereophonic sound a week before his station officially made the announcement, making Creature Feature Washington's first stereo broadcast.

After a five-year hiatus from the air, Count Gore returned to WDCA 20 in 1984 and a second wave of popularity kept the show a local fixture until new owners canceled all local programing in 1987.  During this time, Gore made numerous public appearances with live shows and Halloween events and received thousands of fan correspondences, making Count Gore one of the most popular figures in the history of D.C. media.

In 1998, Count Gore de Vol became the first horror host to present a weekly show on the Internet, featuring streaming video of movies and shorts hosted by the Count, and interviews with celebrities. Other hosts from around the country also contribute to the program, providing reviews, contests, and other "strange and evil creations". There are also several regular features on the site, from movie and book reviews to monster model building and horror inspired music and video games.

Count Gore remains busy, as he approaches his 35th year. He is a regular convention guest at Baltimore, Maryland and the Horrorfind Weekend in Baltimore and Cinema Wasteland in Cleveland, Ohio. In 2004 he wrote the introduction to the Steve Niles' graphic novel Aleister Arcane. In 2006, 2007, and 2008, the Count made appearances in Northern Virginia on the new live television and Internet program Monster Madhouse Live, starring "Karlos Borloff", a.k.a. Jerry Moore. In October 2006 and 2007 he hosted the opening nights for the horror film fest The Spooky Movie Film Festival in Silver Spring, Maryland. He is featured alongside fellow horror hosts in the documentary, American Scary (2006), which screened at the 2007 San Diego Comic-Con. Count Gore also hosted the costume contests at the horror/sci-fi convention Pensacon (Pensacola, Florida) in 2014 and 2015.

See also 
 Horror host
 John Dimes
 Steve Niles

References

External links 
Virginia Creepers Documentary film site dedicated to 50 years of horror hosting in Virginia
Interview with Dick Dyszel where he talks about Count Gore de Vol, including his beginnings as "M.T. Graves."
Official website of The Spooky Movie Film Festival- Washington, D.C.'s International Horror Film Festival
The Horror Host Underground- Count Gore's listing.

American television personalities
Male television personalities
Culture of Washington, D.C.
Gore de Vol
Horror hosts